Jason Drew Harrow (born May 11, 1976), better known by his stage name Kardinal Offishall, is a Canadian rapper, record producer, DJ, and record executive. Often credited as Canada's "hip hop ambassador", he is regarded as one of the country's best hip hop producers, and is best known for his distinctive reggae and dancehall-influenced style of hip hop.

A native of Toronto, Offishall began his career in the city's mid-1990s underground hip hop scene, as a member of The Circle. He released several independent 12" singles, a debut album (Eye & I), and an EP (Husslin'), before signing with major label MCA Records in 2000. The following year, Offishall released his second album, Quest for Fire: Firestarter, Vol. 1, spawning the Billboard hit "BaKardi Slang", which popularized Toronto's nickname "T-dot", and the minor hit "Ol' Time Killin'"; both singles became his signature songs. After failing to release the Firestarter Vol. 2 album in 2003, on MCA, and later Geffen Records (which absorbed MCA), Offishall briefly returned to the underground scene, releasing several more independent 12" singles.

In 2005, Offishall's third album, Fire and Glory, was released in Canada. That year, he collaborated with R&B singer Akon for the first time, starting a musical partnership that lasted until 2010. In 2007, he signed with Akon's Kon Live Distribution label, through Geffen, and released his fourth album, Not 4 Sale, the following year. Its first single, "Dangerous" (featuring Akon), became a top five hit on the Billboard Hot 100, and was certified triple platinum in Canada. Offishall released two gold-certified singles, "Numba 1 (Tide Is High)" (featuring Keri Hilson or Rihanna) and "Body Bounce" (featuring Akon), before leaving Kon Live in late 2010. Since then, his latest singles have been released on his independent label Black Stone Colleagues Inc. In 2012, Offishall released Allow Me to Re-Introduce Myself, a collaborative mixtape with producer Nottz.

In 2013, Offishall became the creative executive director of Universal Music Canada's A&R team. Two years later, he released his fifth album Kardi Gras, Vol. 1: The Clash under the label. On April 8, 2021, Offishall was promoted to senior vice-president of A&R for Universal Music Canada.

Biography

Early life and career beginnings 
Harrow was born in Scarborough, Ontario, in the east end of Toronto, and raised by Jamaican immigrant parents. From the ages of 2 to 13, he lived in the city's Flemingdon Park neighbourhood. He moved back to Scarborough for two years, before finally settling in Oakwood–Vaughan, in the city's west end. While in high school, he would throw parties at the Alexandra Park Community Centre. He also is a former York University student (Philosophy) but did not complete his degree.

He started rapping at the age of eight and was winning competitions by the time he was 12. At age 14, he performed live on stage for the first time, with Nelson Mandela in attendance during Mandela's first visit to Toronto following his release from prison earlier that year (1990). By 1993, he decided to change his alias "KoolAid", and went by the moniker "Kardinal Offishall" after being inspired by the great 17th century French politician Cardinal Richelieu. That year, Offishall co-founded The Circle, a collective of artists including Choclair, Jully Black, Solitair, Tara Chase, and Saukrates. In 1994, he made his first recorded appearance on Saukrates' single "Still Caught Up".

1996–1999: Eye & I 
Kardinal was signed to a publishing deal with Warner/Chappell Music Canada at the age of 20. In 1996, he released his first single "Naughty Dread", which was featured on the Rap Essentials Volume One compilation and earned him a Juno Award nomination for Best Rap Recording. In 1997, Kardinal released his debut album Eye & I on Capitol Hill Music. The only single from the album, "On wit da Show", had considerable video play on MuchMusic. The album received rave reviews from music critics. AllMusic stated that Kardinal "blended soul, dancehall, reggae, hip-hop, and a wholly inventive approach to beats on his 20-track debut album, Eye & I." Unfortunately, the album was poorly distributed in Canada, and a lack of radio support resulted in the album receiving limited commercial attention. Over 4,000 copies of the album were sold in its first three months of release. In 1998, he was featured on the Juno-winning single "Northern Touch" with the Rascalz, Choclair, Checkmate and Thrust. The following year, he produced Choclair's hit single "Let's Ride".

2000–2003: Husslin and Quest for Fire: Firestarter, Vol. 1 
Husslin was an EP released on April 11, 2000. It was released independently on Figure IV Entertainment and distributed by Fat Beats Records in the United States. The title track, "Husslin'", was one of the hottest 12" singles of 2000. "And What?", featuring Saukrates, was released as a single in 1999. "Husslin'" and "Mic T.H.U.G.S." also appear on Kardinal's second studio album, Quest for Fire: Firestarter, Vol. 1. An updated version of "U R Ghetto When", known as "U R Ghetto 2002", is on the Quest for Fire album. In 2000, Kardinal signed with MCA Records. He released the album Quest for Fire: Firestarter, Vol. 1 in 2001, which spawned the hits "BaKardi Slang" and "Ol' Time Killin'".One year after its release, 25,000 copies of the album were sold in Canada. It received generally favorable reviews from music critics. The Source gave the album 3 out of 5 mics. RapReviews.com gave it a 7/10 rating, calling it a "mixed bag," and stating "there are also some perfect 10's to be found here." The A.V. Club gave the album a favorable review, praising its "impressive musical and lyrical consistency." AllMusic gave it 2 out of 5 stars, noting that Kardinal "displays only flashes of promise here." The album was nominated for Best Rap Recording at the 2002 Juno Awards.

After MCA folded in 2003, Kardinal's highly anticipated follow up album Firestarter Vol. 2: The F-Word Theory was shelved along with the music video for the single "Belly Dancer" featuring Pharrell, and Kardinal eventually found himself without a label. Had the album been released, there would have been production from Timbaland and The Neptunes, among others.

For the 20th anniversary of Quest for Fire: Firestarter, Vol. 1, Kardinal released "Firestarter", a capsule clothing collection in collaboration with urbancoolab, an artificial intelligence fashion platform.

2004–2008: Fire and Glory and Not 4 Sale 
In 2004, Kardinal released an independent mixtape titled Kill Bloodclott Bill with his production company, Black Jays, and he also released his second major-label album titled Fire and Glory on November 15, 2005, through Virgin Records in Canada only. Hits on Fire and Glory include "Everyday (Rudebwoy)" and "Heads Up". RapReviews.com gave the album an 8.5/10 rating, stating "Fire and Glory is a better album than Firestarter Vol. 1," and "aside from having better lyrics than most of his counterparts, Kardinal's unique style also sets him apart." The album was nominated for Rap Recording of the Year at the 2006 Juno Awards.

Not 4 Sale is the fourth studio album by Canadian rapper Kardinal Offishall, released September 9, 2008, on Kon Live/Geffen Records. It is his second international major-label album, after 2001's Quest for Fire: Firestarter, Vol. 1. It was a critical success, spawning the top 5 Billboard Hot 100 single "Dangerous", and the minor hit "Numba 1 (Tide Is High)". 11,869 copies of the album were sold in the United States, in its first week of release. It debuted on the Billboard 200 at number 40. As of February 15, 2009, the album has sold 34,822 copies. In Canada, it debuted at number 8 on the Canadian Albums Chart, with 4,247 copies sold in the first week. The album received generally favorable reviews from music critics. AllMusic gave it 4 out of 5 stars, calling it "an entirely solid album", also stating "this freedom fighting and socially conscious writing is tempered with hooky club tracks that never fail."[14] USA Today gave it 3 out of 4 stars, noting "his potent blend of hip-hop and dancehall gives him a flavor all his own."PopMatters gave the album a 6/10 rating, writing "although many of the tracks here are glossy pop productions, Kardinal has not really changed since he was first heard in the '90s."The album won the award for Rap Recording of the Year at the 2009 Juno Awards.

2009–2018: Universal Music Canada partnership and Kardi Gras, Vol. 1: The Clash 
In 2008, he was featured on the Just Dance (RedOne Remix) by Lady Gaga, part of the EP "Just Dance (Remixes, Pt. 2)". In 2010, he was included in the Young Artists for Haiti's version of "Wavin' Flag" in an effort to raise money for disaster relief. He starred along with many Canadian stars. Also in 2010, he was featured in Raghav's single "So Much". In 2011, he collaborated with Canadian dance-pop act Audio Playground on their gold selling single "Famous", which reached #28 in Canada and #10 on the USA Billboard Dance charts. In 2011, he collaborated with singer Karl Wolf on his single "Ghetto Love".

In 2013, Kardinal Offishall, along with Madchild from Swollen Members, were featured on Canadian hip hop artist Classified's self-titled album on the track "Look Up". He also appeared on the charity single "True Colors" by Artists Against Bullying. On December 16, 2013, Offishall joined Universal Music Canada as Creative Executive Director of A&R. Aside from developing Canadian talent, he has also expressed interest in developing international talent, stating "I'm searching the world for superstars." On October 30, 2015, Kardinal Offishall released his fifth studio album Kardi Gras, Vol. 1: The Clash which spawned the hit single "That Chick Right There", which reached number 68 on the Canadian Hot 100.

2019–present: Pick Your Poison 
On June 4, 2019, Kardinal Offishall released a new single called "Run" which was used as the Toronto Raptors theme song during their championship run in the 2019 NBA Finals and also serves as the first single off his upcoming album Pick Your Poison.

In October 2021, it was announced that he will be a judge on the second season of Canada's Got Talent, which aired in 2022. He also made a guest appearance as a fictionalized version of himself in the debut episode of the CBC Television sitcom Run the Burbs.

Personal life 
In July 2016, Kardinal Offishall announced the birth of his first child, a daughter.

Discography 

Studio albums
 Eye & I (1997)
 Quest for Fire: Firestarter, Vol. 1 (2001)
 Fire and Glory (2005)
 Not 4 Sale (2008)
 Kardi Gras, Vol. 1: The Clash (2015)
 Pick Your Poison (TBA)

Collaborative albums
 Allow Me to Re-Introduce Myself (with Nottz) (2012)

Awards 
1999: Juno Award for Rap Recording of the Year for Rascalz' "Northern Touch"
2000: Juno Award for Rap Recording of the Year for producing Choclair's "Let's Ride"
2000: SOCAN Award for "Husslin'"
2001: MuchMusic Video Award – Best Rap Video for "Money Jane"
2002: SOCAN Award for "Money Jane"
2004: Canadian Urban Music Award for "Empty Barrel"
2006: 3 MuchMusic Video Awards – Best Video, Best Director (RT!) and VideoFACT Award for "Everyday (Rudebwoy)"
2009: Juno Award for Single of the Year for "Dangerous"; Juno Award for Rap Recording of the Year for Not 4 Sale
2009: SOCAN Urban Music Award for "Dangerous"
2014: Juno Award for R&B/Soul Recording of the Year for "Can't Choose" (with JRDN)
2019: Honorary Degree from Humber College

Filmography

See also 

Canadian hip hop
Music of Canada

References

External links 

1976 births
20th-century Canadian male musicians
20th-century Canadian rappers
21st-century Canadian male musicians
21st-century Canadian rappers
Black Canadian musicians
Canadian hip hop DJs
Canadian hip hop record producers
Canadian male rappers
Canadian music industry executives
Canadian people of Jamaican descent
Canadian songwriters
Geffen Records artists
Juno Award for Rap Recording of the Year winners
Juno Award for Single of the Year winners
Living people
MCA Records artists
People from Scarborough, Toronto
Rappers from Toronto
York University alumni
Canada's Got Talent judges